Isayah Boers (born 19 June 1999) is a Dutch sprinter, who specializes in the 400 metres.

Boers won the bronze medal at the 2022 World Athletics Indoor Championships in the 4 × 400 metres relay event. At the 2022 European Athletics Championships he finished fourth with the relay team in the 4 × 400 metres relay event. He won a bronze medal at the 2023 European Athletics Indoor Championships also in the 4 × 400 metres relay.

References

1999 births
Dutch male sprinters
Living people
21st-century Dutch people